Hugh Harris may refer to:

Hugh Harris (guitarist), guitarist with the Kooks
Hugh Harris (singer) (1964–2019), English singer and musician
Hugh Harris (ice hockey) (born 1948), former ice hockey player
Hugh Harris (MP), Member of Parliament (MP) for Haverfordwest
Hugh P. Harris (1909–1979), United States Army general